Harry William Taylor (born 4 May 1997) is an English professional footballer who plays for Southend United.

Career
Taylor was in the youth team at Chelsea for seven years, before joining Barnet as an under-15. He made his senior debut with a start in a 3–0 Herts Senior Cup defeat to Bishop's Stortford on 21 January 2014. He returned to the first team on 13 December 2014, starting an FA Trophy tie away to Concord Rangers. He won Barnet's Youth Player of the Year award for the 2014–15 season. Taylor joined Hampton & Richmond Borough on loan in September 2015. After returning to Barnet following a three-month loan spell, he made his debut in the Football League as a late substitute for Curtis Weston at home to Newport County on 26 December 2015. He then joined Staines Town on loan on 18 February 2016, alongside team-mate Ryan Gondoh. On 21 December 2018, Taylor agreed to reunite with former manager, Alan Dowson at Woking on a one-month loan deal. Taylor left Barnet at the end of the 2021-22 season. He made 229 appearances for the Bees, scoring one goal.

Taylor signed for Southend United on 28 June 2022, on a two-year deal with a one-year option.

Personal life
Taylor's younger brother Jack (born 1998) was also in the youth team at Chelsea and later a professional at Barnet and Peterborough United.

Career statistics

References

External links

1997 births
Living people
English footballers
Chelsea F.C. players
Barnet F.C. players
Hampton & Richmond Borough F.C. players
Staines Town F.C. players
Woking F.C. players
Southend United F.C. players
Association football defenders
Association football midfielders
English Football League players
National League (English football) players
Isthmian League players
Footballers from Hammersmith